Driss Mrini (born 11 February 1950) is a Moroccan film and television director, producer and writer.

Biography 
He was born in Salé in 1950 and left to study communication at the University of Hamburg in Germany. After working as an assistant in television production in Germany, he returned to Morocco. Shortly after, he joined the Moroccan national television and made several documentaries.

His film Aida  was chosen to represent Morocco in the Oscars 2016.

Work 
Driss Mrini has produced several films, documentaries and TV programs. Some of the films are:
 1983 : Bamou
 2011 : Larbi
 2015 : Aida
 2017: Lahnech

References

External links

Moroccan film producers
Moroccan film directors
1950 births
Living people